Ludo De Keulenaer (born 16 January 1960) is a Belgian former professional racing cyclist. He rode in four editions of the Tour de France.

References

External links
 

1960 births
Living people
Belgian male cyclists
People from Brasschaat
Cyclists from Antwerp Province